Hubba Bubba is a brand of bubble gum produced by Wm. Wrigley Jr. Company, a subsidiary of Mars, Incorporated.  Introduced in the United States in 1979, the bubble gum got its name from the phrase "Hubba Hubba", which some military personnel in World War II used to express approval. The main gimmick used to promote the gum is that, as Hubba Bubba is less sticky than other brands of gum, it is easier to peel off the skin after a bubble bursts. When Hubba Bubba was first marketed, the gum's flavor (now often referred to as original) was similar to that of others but, over time, different flavors have been produced.

Product description 
Before its launch, Hubba Bubba had been referred to as "Stagecoach" during product development and early manufacturing at the now-defunct Wrigley plant in Santa Cruz, California. The earliest series of TV commercials for Hubba Bubba that aired in the United States were set in a Wild West town and featured a character known as the Gumfighter, played by actor Don Collier. At the end of each commercial, the Gum Fighter declared, "Big bubbles, no troubles," followed by a jocular response from Western film veteran Dub Taylor. This was a reference to Hubba Bubba being less sticky than other brands. Hubba Bubba's main competition for most of the 1980s was the brand Bubblicious.

The original bubble-gum flavor was discontinued for many years in the United Kingdom, with only apple, strawberry, and cola flavors available. As of June 2012, flavors available in the UK include strawberry, original and apple. (In April 2012, the original flavor returned, with packs proclaiming "chunkier and bubblier"). Flavors available in Australia include cherry, cola, peach, strawberry, lime, pineapple, apple, orange, grape and watermelon. As of 2004, flavors available in Croatia included lime, berry, cherry and generic fruit. Flavors available in Germany included cherry and cola. Flavors available in Norway include orange, apple, strawberry, cola and licorice. Flavors available in Canada included strawberry, grape, orange and blue raspberry. Other flavors seen over the years in various countries include lemon, cream soda, tropical, salty liquorice, and chocolate strawberry.

This product as sold in the US includes bioengineered (Genetically Modified or “GMO”) ingredients and the company labels as such without specifying which ingredients are the un-named GMO’s. 

At first, Hubba Bubba was only available in chunks, typically being sold in packets of five chunks. More recently, it has been produced as shredded pieces (see Big League Chew), rolls of bubble gum tape in the UK (tapes of 1.8 meter strips of mixed flavors), plastic jugs of crystals, boxes of tiny gumballs and stuffed with candy.  

The Hubba Bubba brand was discontinued in the U.S. in the early 1990s but returned in 2004.  In the United States, commercials are animated at Aardman in the same stop-motion style used in Wallace and Gromit, the Chevron commercials and Chicken Run. In Canada, commercials are animated in 2D traditional animation by Chuck Gammage Animation and use a duo of cartoon characters named Hubba (purple) and Bubba (pink). It was also used in the closing credits sequence on the popular YTV game show Uh Oh!.

As of 2012, Hubba Bubba is available in its original flavor called "Outrageous Original" in the U.S. Other flavors are "Strawberry Watermelon," "Cool Cola," "Sweet & Sassy Cherry," and "Mystery Flavor". Hubba Bubba introduced Mystery Max and Mystery Tape in 2010.

See also
 List of confectionery brands

References

Products introduced in 1979
Chewing gum
Wrigley Company brands
Brand name confectionery